USS LST-120 was a  in the United States Navy during World War II. She was later transferred to the Republic of Korea Navy and renamed ROKS Munsan.

Construction and commissioning 
LST-120 was laid down on 5 May 1943 at Jeffersonville Boat & Machine Co., Jeffersonville, Indiana. Launched on 7 August 1943 and commissioned on 22 September 1943.

Service in the United States Navy 
During World War II, LST-120 was assigned to the Asiatic-Pacific theater. She took part in the capture and occupation of Saipan from 15 June to 28 July 1944 and also took part in the capture and occupation of Tinian from 24 to 28 July 1944.

She was then assigned to the occupation service in the Far East from 15 to 25 October 1945 and 18 November 1945 to 13 February 1946.

On 7 January 1946, she was decommissioned and transferred to Commander Naval Forces Far East (COMNAVFE), Shipping Control Authority for Japan (SCAJAP), redesignated Q004.

The ship was put on disposal until she was transferred to South Korea in February 1947. The ship was later struck from the Navy Register on 5 March 1947.

Service in the Republic of Korea Navy 
In February 1947, the Korean government bought the LST-120 and named it Munsan. She was moored at Mukho Port to load coal, and when the Korean War broke out, she was requisitioned under the wartime mobilization order of Lieutenant Colonel Kim Du-chan, deputy commander of the ROK Navy's Mukho Guard.

At that time, the Mukho Combat Unit, a joint army-police unit, was fighting against the 549th Army Squadron of the Korean People's Army, which landed on June 25, 1950. Munsan evacuated the retreating Mukho combat unit to Pohang, and three days later, it returned to Mukho with the reorganized Mukho combat unit under the orders of the Naval Headquarters. Around 2 am on June 29, not knowing that the Munsan was left at Mukho Port, she was bombarded by USS Juneau (CL-119), which she mistook for a ship of the Korean People's Army Navy. She just sent a Navy intelligence officer who was on board the Munsan to confirm that she was a ship belonging to the Republic of Korea Navy, clearing up her misunderstanding, and she withdrew to Pohang.

She participated in the Yeosu evacuation operation under the escort of ROKS Baekdusan (PC-701).

On September 14, Munsan set sail to support the Jangsa-dong amphibious operation of the 1st Independent Guerrilla Battalion. She arrived in Jangsa with 772 men in her squadron, but she was soon stranded ashore by Typhoon Kezia. The battalion, which barely landed, attracted the attention of the 2nd Corps of the Korean People's Army for a week, and in the battle with them, Captain Hwang Jae-jung and crew of the Munsan were killed. The survivors were covered by the 7th Fleet bombardment task force, which had USS Helena as their flagship, on September 19 and withdrew aboard the ROK Navy's ROKS Jochiwon.

The secret of the Korean War was revealed to the public when the surviving Amphibious Force students formed the Jangsa Landing Operation Guerrilla Association on July 14, 1980. On September 14, 1991, 51 years since the Jangsa landing operation, the comrades association held a national fund-raising campaign together with the monk of Cheongunsa Temple in Yangpyeong, Gyeonggi-do. Thanks to their efforts, on March 6, 1997, members of the 1st Marine Division, who were searching the shore in front of Jangsari, discovered Munsan in the tidal flat under the sea. No other LSTs were lost in the water except for Munsan.

A 2,000 tons replica of the Munsan was constructed as the Jangsa Landing Operation Commemorative Park. The museum was opened on 16 November 2020.

Awards 
LST-120 have earned the following awards:

 American Campaign Medal
 Europe-Africa-Middle East Campaign Medal (2 battle stars)
 World War II Victory Medal

Citations

Sources

External links 

LST-1-class tank landing ships
Ships built in Jeffersonville, Indiana
World War II amphibious warfare vessels of the United States
1943 ships
Ships transferred from the United States Navy to the Republic of Korea Navy